The Mehsi railway station is a railway station on Muzaffarpur–Gorakhpur main line under the Samastipur railway division of East Central Railway zone. It is located in the Indian State of Bihar district East Champaran City of Mehsi.

References
Mehsi
Railway stations in East Champaran district
Samastipur railway division